Ho (majuscule: Հ; minuscule: հ; Armenian: հո) is the sixteenth letter of the Armenian alphabet, representing the voiceless glottal fricative. It is typically romanized with the letter H. It was part of the alphabet created by Mesrop Mashtots in the 5th century CE. In the Armenian numeral system, it has a value of 70.

Character codes

See also
 Armenian alphabet
 Mesrop Mashtots

References

External links
 Հ on Wiktionary
 հ on Wiktionary

Armenian letters